Ubara-tutu (or Ubartutu) of Shuruppak was the last antediluvian king of Sumer, according to some versions of the Sumerian King List. He was said to have reigned for 18,600 years (5 sars and 1 ner). He was the son of En-men-dur-ana, a Sumerian mythological figure often compared to Enoch, as he entered heaven without dying. Ubara-Tutu was the king of Sumer until a flood swept over his land.

Ubara-tutu is briefly mentioned in tablet XI of the Epic of Gilgamesh. He is identified as the father of Utnapishtim, a character who is instructed by the god Ea to build a boat in order to survive the coming flood.

See also

History of Sumer
List of Mesopotamian dynasties

References

Bibliography

Antediluvian Sumerian kings
Sumerian kings